Chucrallah Boutros Harb  (May 5, 1923 – December 31, 2019) was a Lebanese Hierarch of Maronite Church and an eparch of the Maronite Catholic Eparchy of Baalbek and Maronite Catholic Eparchy of Jounieh.

Biography
Harb was born in Tannourine, Lebanon and was ordained a priest on June 19, 1949. He was appointed bishop to the Eparchy of Baalbek-Deir El-Ahmar on March 15, 1967 by Pope Paul VI and ordained bishop on May 14, 1967 by Maronite Patriarch of Antioch, Paul Peter Meouchi. His co-consecrators were Elie Farah, Archeparch of Cyprus and Joseph Khoury, Archeparch of Tyre. Harb was appointed bishop of the Eparchy of Jounieh on August 4, 1977 and held this position until his retirement on June 5, 1999.

External links
Catholic-Hierarchy
gCatholic.org

1923 births
2019 deaths
20th-century Maronite Catholic bishops
Lebanese Roman Catholic bishops
Lebanese Maronites
20th-century Roman Catholic bishops in Lebanon
People from Tannourine